Nils Philip Gyldenstolpe (19 February 1734 – 20 February 1810) served as the Marshal of the Royal Court of Sweden. From 1773 to 1781 he was the governor of Gävleborg County. From 1789 until his death he occupied Seat No. 1 at the Swedish Academy.

References

1734 births
1810 deaths
Members of the Swedish Academy
County governors of Sweden
Age of Liberty people

Nils Philip